Dato' Sri Huang Tiong Sii is a Malaysian politician and businessman who has served as Deputy Minister of Natural Resources, Environment and Climate Change in the Pakatan Harapan (PH) administration under Prime Minister Anwar Ibrahim and Minister Nik Nazmi Nik Ahmad and the Member of Parliament (MP) for Sarikei since December 2022 as well as Member of the Sarawak State Legislative Assembly (MLA) for Repok since May 2016. He is a member, Vice President and Division Chief of Sarikei of the Sarawak United People's Party (SUPP), a component party of the Gabungan Parti Sarawak (GPS) and formerly Barisan Nasional (BN) coalitions. He also served as Director of the logging firm MM Golden (M) Sdn Bhd prior to his deputy ministerial appointment.

Election results

Honours
  :
  Knight Companion of the Order of the Crown of Pahang (DIMP) – Dato' (2006)
  Grand Knight of the Order of Sultan Ahmad Shah of Pahang (SSAP) – Dato' Sri (2011)

References

Year of birth missing (living people)
Living people